Lynn Marie Vidali (born May 26, 1952), also known by her married name Lynn Gautschi, is an American former competition swimmer, Olympic medalist, and former world record-holder.

As a 16-year-old high school student, Vidali represented the United States at the 1968 Summer Olympics in Mexico City.  She received a silver medal for her second-place performance in the women's 400-meter individual medley (5:22.2), finishing behind U.S. teammate Claudia Kolb (5:08.5).

Four years later, she won a bronze medal in the women's 200-meter individual medley at the 1972 Summer Olympics in Munich, Germany.  In Munich, she also competed in the 400-meter individual medley and the 100-meter breaststroke, but finished out of medal contention in both events.

See also
 List of Olympic medalists in swimming (women)
 List of San Jose State University people
 World record progression 200 metres individual medley
 World record progression 4 × 100 metres medley relay

References

External links
 

1952 births
Living people
American female breaststroke swimmers
American female medley swimmers
World record setters in swimming
Olympic bronze medalists for the United States in swimming
Olympic silver medalists for the United States in swimming
Swimmers from San Francisco
San Jose State Spartans women's swimmers
Swimmers at the 1968 Summer Olympics
Swimmers at the 1972 Summer Olympics
Medalists at the 1972 Summer Olympics
Medalists at the 1968 Summer Olympics
20th-century American women